Dave Roberts is a British musician, known for being the original bassist of the UK gothic rock band Sex Gang Children during the Batcave era of the early 1980s, recording under the name "Dave Sex Gang". He left the band in 1983 following the release of their first studio album, Song and Legend, and formed the group Carcrash International, releasing several singles in the 1983–1985 period.

After emigrating to the US, he participated (as guitarist) in a Sex Gang reunion in 1991–1992, and performed on their 1993 album Medea, released on the recently formed Cleopatra Records label.

He settled in Hollywood in 1993 and formed a new version of Carcrash International with various musicians who were also affiliated with Cleopatra Records. The band released their debut full-length album Fragments of a Journey in Hell in 1994, promoted by a concert in San Francisco with a lineup that also featured drummer Ian Haas, the original drummer of London After Midnight. Carcrash International disbanded the following year.

Roberts later emigrated to Australia, where he taught guitar in the Victorian gold mining town of Ballarat in Victoria.

Discography

Sex Gang Children

Albums
Song and Legend - 1983
Medea - 1993

EPs
Beasts - 1982 
"Sebastiane" - 1983

Singles
"Into the Abyss" - 1982  
"Song and Legend" - 1983  
"Mauritia Mayer" - 1983

Live
Naked – 1982
Live - 1983
Ecstasy and Vendetta Over New York - 1984  )
Nightland - 1986
Play with Children - 1992

Carcrash International

Albums
Fragments of a Journey in Hell - 1994

Singles
"The Title Track From 'The Whip'" – 1983
"All Passion Spent" - 1984
"Crash!" - 1985

Compilations
Compilation Trax - 2002

References

British male singers
Gothic rock musicians
Living people
Year of birth missing (living people)